Carlos Vinicio Quiñónez Sánchez, nicknamed El Buga, (born 20 July 1977) is a Guatemalan football midfielder who last played for local club Deportivo Petapa in the Guatemala's top division.

Club career
Quiñónez played several years for Guatemalan giants Comunicaciones before returning to his first professional club Deportivo Marquense. In July 2007 he joined Xelajú and on 21 January 2008, while still at MC Xelajú, he was involved in a heavy car accident near Quetzaltenango, and was suffering from a lumbar injury, which kept him out for over six months. In January 2009 he signed for Petapa.

International career
Quiñónez made his debut for Guatemala in a January 2000 friendly match against Panama and has earned a total of 29 caps, scoring 1 goal. He has represented his country in 3 FIFA World Cup qualification matches as well as at the 2005 and 2007 UNCAF Cups and the 2007 CONCACAF Gold Cup.

His final international was a November 2007 friendly match against Jamaica.

International goals
Scores and results list. Guatemala's goal tally first.

External links

References

1977 births
Living people
People from Puerto Barrios
Guatemalan footballers
Guatemala international footballers
2005 UNCAF Nations Cup players
2007 UNCAF Nations Cup players
2007 CONCACAF Gold Cup players
Deportivo Marquense players
Comunicaciones F.C. players
Xelajú MC players
Association football midfielders
Deportivo Petapa players